Élan is the third album by Firefall, released in 1978. It featured the single "Strange Way" which reached #11 on the Billboard Hot 100 and #24 on the Adult Contemporary chart.

Track listing 
 "" – 4:41 (Rick Roberts)
 "Sweet and Sour" – 3:29 (Jock Bartley, Rick Roberts)
 "Wrong Side of Town" – 2:43 (Larry Burnett)
 "Count Your Blessings" – 3:29 (Rick Roberts)
 "Get You Back" – 4:10 (Larry Burnett)
 "Anymore" – 3:56 (Mark Andes, Larry Burnett)
 "Baby" – 3:45 (Larry Burnett)
 "Goodbye, I Love You" – 4:19  (Rick Roberts)
 "Sweet Ann" – 3:20 (Rick Roberts)
 "Winds of Change" – 3:24 (Rick Roberts)

Charts

Personnel 
Firefall
 Rick Roberts - lead vocals, rhythm acoustic guitar
 Larry Burnett - lead vocals, rhythm electric and acoustic guitars
 Jock Bartley - lead electric and acoustic guitars, backing vocals, electric slide guitar, 
 David Muse - keyboards, organ, Moog synthesizer, tenor saxophone, flute, harmonica
 Mark Andes - bass, backing vocals
 Michael Clarke - drums

References

1978 albums
Firefall albums
albums produced by Tom Dowd
Atlantic Records albums